Küllo is an Estonian-language male given name.

People named Küllo include:
 Küllo Arjakas (born 1959), Estonian historian and politician
 Küllo Kõiv (1972–1998), Estonian wrestler

References

Estonian masculine given names